Probstia is a genus of beetles in the family Cicindelidae, containing the following species:

 Probstia astoni Wiesner, 2010
 Probstia triumphalis (W. Horn, 1902)
 Probstia triumphaloides (Sawada & Wiesner, 1999)

References

Cicindelidae